Stadler Rail is a Swiss manufacturer of railway rolling stock, with an emphasis on regional train multiple units and trams. It is also focused on niche products, such as being one of the last European manufacturers of rack railway rolling stock. Stadler Rail is headquartered in Bussnang, Switzerland.

The holding company consists of nine subsidiaries with locations in Algeria, Germany, Italy, the Netherlands, Austria, Poland, Switzerland, Spain, Czech Republic, Hungary, Belarus and the United States, and upcoming joint ventures with INKA in Indonesia and with Medha Servo Drives in India. Stadler Rail employed approximately 6,100 employees by 2012, including 2,750 in Switzerland, 1,200 in Germany, 1,000 in Belarus, 400 in Hungary and 400 in Poland. By 2017, this had increased to 7,000 employees.

History
Stadler Rail traces its origins back to an engineering office established by Ernst Stadler during 1942. Three years later, the company began to manufacture its first locomotives, building both  battery-electric and diesel types. Throughout the majority of Stadler Rail's existence, it operated as a relatively small family-owned business entirely based in Switzerland that traditionally focused on manufacturing highly customised rail vehicles for its clients. The customer base were typically within relatively niche markets, such as narrow gauge and mountain railway operators, rather than those operating conventional mainline railways. Stadler Rail remained a relatively small rolling stock manufacturer even through to the 1990s; by the mid-1990s, Stadler reportedly had only 100 employees.

During 1984, Stadler Rail decided to embark on the manufacture of passenger rolling stock for the first time. During the mid-to-late 1990s, the business continued to expand via the launch of new products, as well as the acquisition of two other Swiss factories that built specialist rail vehicles for rack-and-pinion and narrow gauge railways. Stadler Rail experienced a considerable uptick in business during the latter years of 1990s. Its customer base continued to expand year after year over the following two decades to become one of the fastest growing and most innovative train manufacturing companies operating in Europe. Stadler Rail has become a serious competitor in several categories to traditional major rolling stock companies, such as Alstom, Bombardier and Siemens, and has successfully secured several major orders from the incumbent train operating companies of several nations.

In 1999, Stadler Rail took a 67% shareholding in a joint venture with Adtranz to manufacture the Regio-Shuttle RS1. However, following Adtranz's acquisition by Bombardier during 2000, European Union regulators insisted on the divestiture of the regional and tram product lines. As a consequence, Stadler Rail took 100% ownership of the Pankow factory in Berlin, becoming its first manufacturing base in Germany, in 2001. Production of the RS1 has continued, becoming the market leading tram in the nation.

Perhaps the company's most successful product has been the FLIRT (Fast Light Innovative Regional Train) family, the range includes highly diverse configurations to suit different needs, from smaller regional units to luxurious intercity trainsets, as well as broad gauge versions for Finland and former Soviet Union nations. During 2004, Stadler Rail delivered the first trainset to the Swiss Federal Railways. By 2019, in excess of 1,400 FLIRTs have been ordered by operators in 16 countries spread across Europe, the United States, Algeria and Azerbaijan.

To facilitate an expanded order book and wider customer base, the company has rapidly expanded its production capabilities. To serve the Eastern European market alone, during 2005, a new assembly plant was built in Hungary, while another was completed in Poland in the following year; six years later, a third manufacturing site was established in Belarus. By late 2019, the firm reportedly employed in excess of 7,000 employees at various locations spread across 20 countries. Each year, hundreds of rail vehicles, including trams, locomotives and coaches, are completed by the firm. In addition to its manufacturing efforts, considerable business is derived from contracted maintenance and refurbishment programmes, which Stadler Rail provides to operators throughout Europe, the United States, the Middle East and the North African regions.

The company has also grown via numerous acquisitions, including the Swiss company Winpro AG based in Winterthur during 2005, Voith Rail Services of the Netherlands in 2013, and Vossloh Rail Vehicles of Valencia during 2015. They have been integrated into the wider Stadler Rail organisation, broadening the range of products and services on offer.

For many years, Peter Spuhler has served as the company's chief executive officer (CEO), as well as holding a major stake in the business. According to Peter Jenelten, Stadler Rail's Executive Vice-President for Marketing and Sales, has credited the business' relatively lean structure as having enabled very rapid decision-making and reducing product's time to market, which in turn has been an important selling point for its customers. Railway industry periodical Rail Magazine has claimed that Stadler Rail has been a major beneficiary of customer dissatisfaction with the dominant market competitors, particularly in terms of delivery and certification issues.

During 2014, Stadler Rail announced the formation of a joint venture with Azerbaijan-based company International Railway Distribution LLC to manufacture rolling stock in the nation. One month prior, Stadler had received a SFr120 million contract to produce 30 sleeper and dining cars. Rolling stock originally intended for Russia has also been resold to Azerbaijan and neighbouring Georgia.

Stadler Rail had traditionally avoided major involvement with the British railway customer base, which it has claimed was due to the unfavourable complexity of the regulatory environment. However, in 2017, management decided to embark on a decisive push into Britain, both to acquire market share amongst its rail operators and to establish new manufacturing and servicing facilities. It quickly secured a £610 million order from Abellio Greater Anglia for its FLIRT family, leading to 378 vehicles conforming to the UK's restrictive loading gauge that were built in Bussnang. Further orders in the UK market have included Glasgow Subway's order for 17 underground trains, operating via an automated driverless system, it is a first for Stadler. Another major order came from Merseytravel for bespoke electric trains.

During April 2019, Stadler Rail was listed on the SIX Swiss Exchange, reducing Spuhler's stake in the company to 40%. Prior to the listing, Spuhler had owned 80% of the business's share capital, while RAG Stiftung held a further 10% key employees, and the remaining 10% was divided amongst several senior employees at the firm.

In recent years, the light rail and metro sectors have become increasingly important customers. Various operators in Germany, Norway, and Britain have adopted the company's Variobahn trams, while Stadler Rail received its first contract for underground trains during 2015. In December 2015, the firm’s had a huge order via a joint venture with Siemens Mobility for up to 1,380 vehicles for Berlin's S-Bahn, the last of which are to be delivered by 2023. During 2019, Stadler Rail was reportedly making efforts to capitalise on smaller operators, driven by trends towards regionalisation and open-access operation, to secure business for its railcars, light rail vehicles and multiple units.

Stadler has a large manufacturing facility in Fanipaĺ, Belarus. Following the disputed 2020 Belarusian presidential elections and the 2022 Russian invasion of Ukraine, the company came under pressure to reduce its exposure in those countries. By June 2022, electronic parts used to assemble rail equipment are no longer deliverable to Fanipaĺ due to international sanctions against Belarus following the forced diversion of Ryanair Flight 4978. In response, Stadler moved equipment and personnel to Poland, Switzerland and the US to make up for that loss. The board of directors decided to keep the site and stressed that the company has to follow supranational decisions by international organisations such as the OECD, UN and EU but their commitment is towards the people working at the site, stating that Stadler "serves the public not dictators".

Factories 

 Bussnang (CH); site of original factory 1962
 Stadler Bussnang AG
 Altenrhein (CH); acquired in 1997 from the Schindler Group
 Stadler Altenrhein AG
 Pankow, Berlin (D); acquired in 2000/2001 from Adtranz
 Stadler Pankow GmbH
 Biel/Bienne (CH); 2004 acquired by bid
 Stadler Stahlguss AG
 Siedlce (PL); 2007 acquired by
 Stadler Polska Sp.z o.o.
 Weiden in der Oberpfalz; ex Partner für Fahrzeugausstattung (PFA), since 4 January 2005 called
 Stadler Weiden GmbH
 Winterthur (CH); ex Winpro AG (ex Swiss Locomotive and Machine Works) acquired on 7 September 2005
 Stadler Winterthur AG
Szolnok (HU); since 2009
 Stadler Szolnok Kft.
 Fanipaĺ (BY); 2014 acquired
 ZAT Stadler Minsk
 Salt Lake City (Utah (US)); 2015
 Stadler US Inc.
 Albuixech (Valencia (ES)); ex Vossloh rail-vehicles division (ex MACOSA plant of Alstom), acquired in 2015
 Stadler Rail Valencia SAU
 Craiova (RO); 2019 joint venture with Electroputere for rolling stock equipment manufacturing
 Banyuwangi (ID); joint venture with PT INKA, under construction
 PT Stadler INKA Indonesia
 Hyderabad (Telangana (IN)); joint venture with Medha Servo Drives, under construction

Products

Stadler markets a range of standard modular vehicles, including:
 The EC250 (SMILE), a high speed electric multiple unit.
 The FLIRT, an electric, diesel, bi-mode or hydrogen multiple unit.
 The GTW, an articulated railcar.
 The KISS, a bilevel electric multiple unit.
 The Regio Shuttle, a single unit diesel Railcar.
The WINK, a diesel/battery or electric/battery short multiple unit.
 The SPATZ, a narrow gauge railcar with panoramic windows.
 The Tango, a high-floor or partial low-floor tram.
 The Variobahn, a fully low-floor tram.
 The METRO, a fully customisable electric multiple-unit train for urban rapid transit systems. Currently used on Berlin U-Bahn as BVG Class IK, and as M110/M111 series for Minsk Metro. Upcoming orders include the under construction driverless Glasgow Subway rolling stock, the Class 777 electric multiple units for suburban Merseyrail services in Liverpool, CQ400 rail cars for the MARTA subway system of Atlanta, Georgia, and Class 555 EMUs for the Tyne and Wear Metro system.

Since purchasing Vossloh España in 2016, Stadler Rail have additionally manufactured the following former Vossloh designs:
 The Citylink, a tram-train in service in Germany, Spain and the United Kingdom (Sheffield Supertram Class 399)
 The Euro, a diesel-electric locomotive built for the European market
 The Eurolight, a lighter variant for passenger and light freight roles, in use in the United Kingdom (Class 68)
 The Euro Dual, an electro-diesel variant, in use in the United Kingdom (Class 88)

Stadler has also built a number of custom vehicles for specific customers, in some cases including elements of their standard designs. These include:
 The NExT, a custom design for Regionalverkehr Bern-Solothurn in Switzerland
 The Allegra, a custom EMU for Rhaetian Railway in Switzerland
 The Capricorn, another custom EMU for Rhaetian Railway
 The Ee 922, an electric shunting locomotive built for Swiss Federal Railways
 The Eem 923, a hybrid electro-diesel shunting locomotive built for Swiss Federal Railways
 The RABe 514, a bilevel electric multiple unit train for the Zürich S-Bahn (with Siemens Transportation Systems)
 semi-modular light-rail vehicles for the Forchbahn and Trogenerbahn in Switzerland
 Rack railway cars for the Wengernalpbahn, the Jungfraubahn and the Rorschach-Heiden-Bahn in Switzerland, the Montserrat Railway and the Vall de Núria Railway in Spain, the Diakofto–Kalavryta Railway in Greece, the Manitou and Pikes Peak Railway in the United States, and the Corcovado Rack Railway in Brazil
 The He 4/4 for MRS Logística in Brazil, the most powerful cogwheel locomotive in the world
 As-yet unnamed bilevel coaches for the Rocky Mountaineer. The cars will be similar in design to the Colorado Railcar Ultra Dome.
 Metelitsa tram for Ostrava
 DBAG Class 483/484 for Berlin S-Bahn (with Siemens Mobility)
 New Zealand DM class locomotive for KiwiRail in New Zealand.
 SL X15p for the Roslagsbanan in Sweden
 Glasgow Subway 3rd generation rolling stock for the Glasgow Subway in Scotland. They are constructed to the system's unusual track gauge of 1219 mm (4 ft), and have provision for driverless operation.

References

External links 

 Stadler Rail
 Stadler Winterthur

 
Tram manufacturers
Rolling stock manufacturers of Switzerland
Rolling stock manufacturers of Germany
Rail vehicle manufacturers of Poland
Swiss brands
Electric vehicle manufacturers of Switzerland
Companies listed on the SIX Swiss Exchange
Manufacturing companies established in 1942
Swiss companies established in 1942